Marc Martí Roig (born 19 June 1997) is a Spanish professional basketball player for Força Lleida of the LEB Oro.

Career

Zaragoza

Martí played for CE Lleida Bàsquet youth system before moving Basket Zaragoza at the age of 16. Still a junior, on 1 March 2015, he made his professional debut playing 1 minute on a Liga ACB game against Baloncesto Fuenlabrada. He spent next season playing for farm team El Olivar in LEB Plata. On 16 December 2015, played 8 minutes of 2015–16 Eurocup game against Reyer Venezia.

On 29 July 2016, was loaned to Força Lleida in LEB Oro after a 3 years contract extension. On 21 June 2017, was loaned again to his hometown team. Played 2018–19 ACB season with Zaragoza before his contract ending.

Força Lleida

On 30 July 2019, he joins Força Lleida on a one-year contract.

National team

Martí played for the Spanish men's national team on the 2016 FIBA Europe Under-20 Championship, winning gold medal. Also a member of the team on the 2017 FIBA Europe Under-20 Championship.

References

External links
ACB profile 
FEB profile 

1997 births
Living people
Spanish men's basketball players
Liga ACB players
Basket Zaragoza players
Força Lleida CE players
Power forwards (basketball)
Sportspeople from Lleida